Davenport Blues is a 1925 song composed and recorded by Bix Beiderbecke and released as a Gennett 78. The song has become a jazz and pop standard.

Background
"Davenport Blues" was recorded by Bix Beiderbecke and His Rhythm Jugglers at the Gennett studio on Monday, January 26, 1925, in Richmond, Indiana, and released as Gennett 5654 backed with "Toddlin' Blues" as the A side. The band consisted of Tommy Dorsey on trombone, Paul Madeira Mertz on piano, Don Murray on clarinet, Howdy Quicksell on banjo, Tom Gargano on drums, and Bix Beiderbecke on cornet. Hoagy Carmichael was present at the recording session. The title derives from the name of Bix Beiderbecke's hometown of Davenport, Iowa.

The instrumental is made up of a four bar introduction, a 16 bar verse followed by a 32 bar chorus, after which the verse and chorus are repeated with a 2 bar extended ending. The same melody is used for the verses, but both choruses have different melodies though nearly identical chords. Only on the last refrain of the chorus do we hear the melody which can be identified as "Davenport Blues". Both choruses end in different chord progressions. In the first chorus Bix plays breaks over chords.

In 2020, Juliet Kurtzman and Pete Malinverni recorded the song on the Candlelight: Love in the Time of Cholera album.

Cover versions

 Miff Mole and His Molers, 1927, Okeh 40848
 Charleston Chasers under the direction of Red Nichols, 1927, Columbia 909D
 Adrian Rollini and His Orchestra, 1934, Decca 359
 Bunny Berigan and His Orchestra, 1938, Victor 26121B
 Tommy Dorsey and His Orchestra, 1938, Victor 26135
 Gil Evans, 1959, from the album Great Jazz Standards with Johnny Coles on trumpet
 Clare Fischer, 1963, from the album Surging Ahead
 Jack Teagarden
 Bobby Hackett
 Eddie Condon
 Yank Lawson and the V-Disc All Stars on V-Disc No. 404B, 1945.
 Scott Robinson, 2000, from the album Melody From the Sky 
 Jimmy Lytell Pathe Actuelle 11557, Perfect 14956, Feb., 1928; Jazz Oracle, 2012
 Russ Freeman
 Barbara Sutton Curtis
 Dill Jones, 1972, from the album Davenport Blues
 Kenny Werner, 1977
 Ry Cooder, 1978, from the album Jazz
 Dutch Swing College Band
 Randy Sandke
 Lawson-Haggart Jazz Band
 Bix movie soundtrack album, 1991
 Dice of Dixie Crew
 Dick Hyman
 Geoff Muldaur
 Patrick Artero, 2006
 Scandinavian Rhythm Boys, 2007
 Harry Gold and His Pieces of Eight
 David Sanborn, 2010		
 Bucky Pizzarelli, 2012	
 Ryan Truesdell, 2015
 Juliet Kurtzman and Pete Malinverni, Candlelight: Love in the Time of Cholera, 2020

References

 Bix: Man and Legend by Richard M. Sudhalter & Philip R. Evens (Quartet; 1974).
 Bix: The Definitive Biography of a Jazz Legend by Jean Pierre Lion with the assistance of Gabriella Page-Fort, Michael B. Heckman and Norman Field (Continuum, New York / London; 2004).
 "Our Language." Episode 3, Jazz (television miniseries) by Ken Burns.  (PBS Home Video/Warner Home Video; 2001). 
 Red Hot Jazz.com

External links
 dpl Quad City Memory
 Bix Beiderbecke Resources: A Bixography
 Bix Beiderbecke Resources: A Creative Aural History Thesis - A series of nineteen one-half-hour radio programs from 1971. Includes interviews with Frank Trumbauer, Louis Armstrong, Gene Krupa, Eddie Condon, Bing Crosby and Bix' brother Charles "Burnie" Beiderbecke
 The Bix Beiderbecke Memorial Society, Davenport, Iowa
 "Davenport Blues" via YouTube - An mp3 of Beiderbecke's first recording under his own name.
 Celebrating Bix - A tribute album created to commemorate the centenary of Bix's birth by some of the world's finest traditional jazz musicians.
 "Bixology" (an excerpt) by Brendan Wolfe, Jazz.com.
 Twelve Essential Bix Beiderbecke Performances by Brendan Wolfe, Jazz.com.
 Quad City Times Bix 7, Davenport, IA

1925 songs
1920s jazz standards
Jazz compositions
Instrumentals
American jazz songs